Connecticut's 115th House of Representatives district elects one member of the Connecticut House of Representatives. It encompasses parts of West Haven and has been represented by Democrat Dorinda Keenan Borer since 2017.

Recent elections

2020

2018

2017 special

2016

2014

2012

References

115